McLeod is an unincorporated community in southeastern Cass County, Texas, United States.

The McLeod Independent School District serves area students. MISD has sports such as basketball, baseball/softball, cross country, tennis, track, and golf. The school has over 300 students.

The grades range from PreK-12

External links
 

Unincorporated communities in Texas
Unincorporated communities in Cass County, Texas